Lift and strike may refer to:

Lift and strike (Bosnian War), an American policy proposal during the Bosnian War
Lift-and-strike welding
A movement in the game of hurling